Paola Quattrini (born 9 March 1944) is an Italian actress.

Career
She debuted as child actor in Il bacio di una morta (1949). From then she started a very long career between stage, film and television, starring in hundreds of productions. In 1993 she won a Nastro d'Argento for Best supporting Actress for Pupi Avati's Fratelli e sorelle. In 2004 the President of the Italian Republic Carlo Azeglio Ciampi has conferred her the honor of Commander of the Order of Merit of the Italian Republic, for a life dedicated to the cinema, television and theater.

In 2009 she published the semi-autobiographical novel A.M.O.R.E. ("L.O.V.E.").

Filmography

Films

Television

References

External links 
 Official site
 

1944 births
Living people
Italian film actresses
Actresses from Rome
Italian television actresses
Italian stage actresses
Italian child actresses
Commanders of the Order of Merit of the Italian Republic
Nastro d'Argento winners